"Nappy Heads" is a song written and performed by the hip-hop group Fugees. "Nappy Heads" was issued as the second single from the group's debut album Blunted on Reality. The original version of the song was co-produced by Pras and Wyclef Jean, and written by Lauryn Hill. "Nappy Heads" was recorded at House of Music Studios in New Jersey. However, the more-well known, definitive remix version (titled "Nappy Heads - Remix") was produced by Salaam Remi. The song became the group's first entry on the Billboard Hot 100, peaking at number 49. The song also reached #1 on the Billboard dance chart.

Chart positions

Music video

The official music video for "Nappy Heads" was directed by Max Malkin.

References

External links
 
 

1992 songs
1994 singles
Fugees songs
Ruffhouse Records singles
Song recordings produced by Wyclef Jean
Song recordings produced by Pras
Songs written by Lauryn Hill